Byron is a British television film based on the adult life of English poet Lord Byron. Written by Nick Dear and directed by Julian Farino, it features Jonny Lee Miller in the title role alongside Vanessa Redgrave who portrays Lady Melbourne. It was first aired by the BBC in two, 75 minute parts in September 2003.

Cast

Episodes

Production
The drama was announced in November 2002 by BBC Controller of Drama Commissioning Jane Tranter, written by Nick Dear and to be directed by Julian Farino. Writing about the announcement for The Daily Telegraph, Tom Leonard said that the production "is the latest example of the corporation's fixation with producing period dramas that are 'relevant to a modern audience'".  It was produced by Ruth Baumgarten with executive producers Laura Mackie, Hilary Salmon and Andrea Miller.

Miller said that as a result of his portrayal, his opinion of Byron was that: "He had the ability to be an extraordinarily nice, kind man but he could also be really quite cruel when he made his mind up about somebody. I certainly don't like the way he treated some people."

Lady Caroline Lamb was seen by Power as a "child woman, incredibly vulnerable and one of those people with a huge life force".

Reception
According to overnight figures, 2.1 million viewers (12% audience share) saw the first part with 1.8 million viewers (11% share) watching the second following the BBC Two broadcast.

In a preview ahead of its airing on BBC America in 2005, The New York Times said that the film "paints a sympathetic, at times serious-minded portrait without glossing over his vanity and artful affectations", and that Miller "skillfully blends his restless passion and moments of sour self-awareness". Writing for British Film Institute's Screenonline website, Alexander Larman also praised Miller's performance, saying in a profile of the actor that his portrayal of Byron was "sensitive and nuanced". Peter Chochran, writing about Byron portrayal on screen, described Miller as "outstanding in the lead: the most successful screen Byron there is".

Jenny Bevan won the Costume Design (Drama) award at the Royal Television Society Craft and Design Awards in 2004 for her work on the production. The awards also saw John Paul Kelly nominated in the Production Design (Drama) category.

References

External links

 
 
 Byron BBC press pack

BBC television dramas
Biographical films about poets
2003 British television series debuts
2003 British television series endings
2000s British drama television series
2000s British television miniseries
British television films
Period television series
2003 films
Films set in the 1810s
Films set in the 1820s
English-language television shows
Films directed by Julian Farino